Fred or Frederick Stanley may refer to:

Fred Stanley (politician) (1888–1957), Australian politician in the New South Wales Legislative Assembly
Fred Stanley (baseball) (born 1947), Major League Baseball infielder and executive
Frederick Stanley, 16th Earl of Derby (1841–1908), British politician and Governor General of Canada
Frederick Trent Stanley (1802–1883), American industrialist
Frederick Stanley (cricketer) (1923–1993), New Zealand cricketer